The National Women's Soccer League Players Association (often known as NWSL Players Association or NWSLPA) is the officially recognized union of players in the National Women's Soccer League (NWSL).

History
The NWSLPA was formed in May 2017 under the leadership of Yael Averbuch and represented by lawyer and former WPS player Meghann Burke. The NWSLPA officially unionized in November 2018.

Until the end of the 2021 season, the NWSLPA membership excluded United States federation players because those players were contracted with the US Soccer Federation (USSF) for their play in the NWSL. In December 2021, the USSF and the union representing the U.S. national team (USWNT) agreed to end the NWSL federation players system, which means that USWNT players playing in the NWSL are now contracted directly to their NWSL teams and that those players will also be represented in their club employment by the NWSLPA.

Leadership
 the NWSLPA is led by executive director Meghann Burke and president Tori Huster. The executive team is advised by an advisory board and a group of player representatives of two players per each NWSL team.

Awards

The NWSL Players Association began awarding its own NWSL Players' Awards, voted on by the players of the NWSL, in 2019. These awards are considered one of the major end-of-season awards for NWSL players alongside the league's own awards. As there are often differences between the league's own awards and the NWSL Players' Awards, many NWSL players consider the NWSL Players' Awards to be more prestigious as they are decided by only players themselves. The inaugural edition of the NWSL Players' Awards included three categories: Players' Player of the Year, Players' Rookie of the Year, and Players' Team of the Year.

References

External links
 
 
 

Sports trade unions of the United States
Trade unions established in 2017
Players
Association football trade unions
Soccer organizations in the United States
2017 establishments in the United States